The Mahalanobis distance is a measure of the distance between a point P and a distribution D, introduced by P. C. Mahalanobis in 1936. Mahalanobis's definition was prompted by the problem of identifying the similarities of skulls based on measurements in 1927.

It is a multi-dimensional generalization of the idea of measuring how many standard deviations away P is from the mean of D. This distance is zero for P at the mean of D and grows as P moves away from the mean along each principal component axis. If each of these axes is re-scaled to have unit variance, then the Mahalanobis distance corresponds to standard Euclidean distance in the transformed space. The Mahalanobis distance is thus unitless, scale-invariant, and takes into account the correlations of the data set.

Definition

We can find useful decompositions of the squared Mahalanobis distance that help to explain some reasons for the outlyingness of multivariate observations and also provide a graphical tool for identifying outliers.

That is, the Mahalanobis distance is the Euclidean distance after a whitening transformation.

Different choices have different theoretical and practical advantages.

When the affine span of the samples is not the entire , the covariance matrix would not be positive-definite, which means the above definition would not work. However, in general, the Mahalanobis distance is preserved under any full-rank affine transformation of the affine span of the samples.

Intuitive explanation

Consider the problem of estimating the probability that a test point in N-dimensional Euclidean space belongs to a set, where we are given sample points that definitely belong to that set. Our first step would be to find the centroid or center of mass of the sample points. Intuitively, the closer the point in question is to this center of mass, the more likely it is to belong to the set.

However, we also need to know if the set is spread out over a large range or a small range, so that we can decide whether a given distance from the center is noteworthy or not. The simplistic approach is to estimate the standard deviation of the distances of the sample points from the center of mass. If the distance between the test point and the center of mass is less than one standard deviation, then we might conclude that it is highly probable that the test point belongs to the set. The further away it is, the more likely that the test point should not be classified as belonging to the set.

This intuitive approach can be made quantitative by defining the normalized distance between the test point and the set to be , which reads: . By plugging this into the normal distribution we can derive the probability of the test point belonging to the set.

The drawback of the above approach was that we assumed that the sample points are distributed about the center of mass in a spherical manner. Were the distribution to be decidedly non-spherical, for instance ellipsoidal, then we would expect the probability of the test point belonging to the set to depend not only on the distance from the center of mass, but also on the direction. In those directions where the ellipsoid has a short axis the test point must be closer, while in those where the axis is long the test point can be further away from the center.

Putting this on a mathematical basis, the ellipsoid that best represents the set's probability distribution can be estimated by building the covariance matrix of the samples. The Mahalanobis distance is the distance of the test point from the center of mass divided by the width of the ellipsoid in the direction of the test point.

Normal distributions

For a normal distribution in any number of dimensions, the probability density of an observation  is uniquely determined by the Mahalanobis distance :
 
Specifically,  follows the chi-squared distribution with  degrees of freedom, where  is the number of dimensions of the normal distribution. To determine a threshold to achieve a particular probability, use  , for 2 dimensions. For number of dimensions other than 2, the cumulative chi-squared distribution should be consulted.

In a normal distribution, the region where the Mahalanobis distance is less than one (i.e. the region inside the ellipsoid at distance one) is exactly the region where the probability distribution is concave.

Mahalanobis distance is proportional, for a normal distribution, to the square root of the negative log-likelihood (after adding a constant so the minimum is at zero).

Other forms of multivariate location and scatter 

The sample mean and covariance matrix can be quite sensitive to outliers, therefore other approaches to calculating the multivariate location and scatter of data are also commonly used when calculating the Mahalanobis distance.  The Minimum Covariance Determinant approach estimates multivariate location and scatter from a subset numbering  data points that has the smallest variance-covariance matrix determinant.  The Minimum Volume Ellipsoid approach is similar to the Minimum Covariance Determinant approach in that it works with a subset of size  data points, but the Minimum Volume Ellipsoid estimates multivariate location and scatter from the ellipsoid of minimal volume that encapsulates the  data points.  Each method varies in its definition of the distribution of the data, and therefore produces different Mahalanobis distances.  The Minimum Covariance Determinant and Minimum Volume Ellipsoid approaches are more robust to samples that contain outliers, while the sample mean and covariance matrix tends to be more reliable with small and biased data sets.

Relationship to normal random variables
If we square both sides, and take the square-root, we will get an equation for a metric that looks a lot like the Mahalanobis distance:

The resulting magnitude is always non-negative and varies with the distance of the data from the mean, attributes that are convenient when trying to define a model for the data.

Relationship to leverage

Mahalanobis distance is closely related to the leverage statistic, but has a different scale:

Applications
Mahalanobis distance is widely used in cluster analysis and classification techniques. It is closely related to Hotelling's T-square distribution used for multivariate statistical testing and Fisher's Linear Discriminant Analysis that is used for supervised classification.

In order to use the Mahalanobis distance to classify a test point as belonging to one of N classes, one first estimates the covariance matrix of each class, usually based on samples known to belong to each class. Then, given a test sample, one computes the Mahalanobis distance to each class, and classifies the test point as belonging to that class for which the Mahalanobis distance is minimal.

Mahalanobis distance and leverage are often used to detect outliers, especially in the development of linear regression models. A point that has a greater Mahalanobis distance from the rest of the sample population of points is said to have higher leverage since it has a greater influence on the slope or coefficients of the regression equation. Mahalanobis distance is also used to determine multivariate outliers. Regression techniques can be used to determine if a specific case within a sample population is an outlier via the combination of two or more variable scores. Even for normal distributions, a point can be a multivariate outlier even if it is not a univariate outlier for any variable (consider a probability density concentrated along the line , for example), making Mahalanobis distance a more sensitive measure than checking dimensions individually.

Mahalanobis distance has also been used in ecological niche modelling, as the convex elliptical shape of the distances relates well to the concept of the fundamental niche.

Another example of usage is in finance, where Mahalanobis distance has been used to compute an indicator called the "turbulence index", which is a statistical measure of financial markets abnormal behaviour. An implementation as a Web API of this indicator is available online.

Software implementations
Many programs and statistics packages, such as R, Python, etc., include implementations of Mahalanobis distance.

See also
 Bregman divergence (the Mahalanobis distance is an example of a Bregman divergence)
 Bhattacharyya distance related, for measuring similarity between data sets (and not between a point and a data set)
 Hamming distance identifies the difference bit by bit of two strings
 Hellinger distance, also a measure of distance between data sets
 Similarity learning, for other approaches to learn a distance metric from examples.

References

External links 
 
 Mahalanobis distance tutorial – interactive online program and spreadsheet computation
 Mahalanobis distance (Nov-17-2006) – overview of Mahalanobis distance, including MATLAB code
 What is Mahalanobis distance? – intuitive, illustrated explanation, from Rick Wicklin on blogs.sas.com

Statistical distance
Multivariate statistics
Distance